Vasilissa Olga (Queen Olga) was the second and last destroyer of her class built for the Royal Hellenic Navy in Great Britain before the Second World War. She participated in the Greco-Italian War in 1940–1941, escorting convoys and unsuccessfully attacking Italian shipping in the Adriatic Sea. After the German invasion of Greece in April 1941, the ship escorted convoys between Egypt and Greece until she evacuated part of the government to Crete later that month and then to Egypt in May. After the Greek surrender on 1 June, Vasilissa Olga served with British forces for the rest of her career.

She escorted convoys in the Eastern Mediterranean for the next several months before she was sent to India for a refit. The ship resumed convoy escort duties upon its completion at the beginning of 1942 in the Mediterranean and the Red Sea. In December of that year, now operating in the Central Mediterranean, Vasilissa Olga and a British destroyer briefly captured an Italian submarine, but it sank while under tow. The following month, the ship, together with a pair of British destroyers, sank a small Italian transport ship. She was briefly tasked to escort an Australian troop convoy in the Red Sea in February 1943 before returning to the Mediterranean. Together with a British destroyer, Vasilissa Olga sank at least two ships from an Italian convoy in June. Over the next several months, she escorted British ships as the Allies invaded Sicily (Operation Husky) and mainland Italy (Operation Avalanche).

The ship was transferred back to the Eastern Mediterranean in September to participate in the Dodecanese Campaign. Together with two British destroyers, she helped to destroy a small German convoy in the islands before beginning to ferry troops and supplies to the small British garrison on the island of Leros. After completing one such mission, she was sunk by German bombers in Lakki harbor on 26 September with the loss of 72 men.

Design and description
The Vasilefs Georgios-class ships were derived from the British G-class destroyers, modified with German guns and fire-control systems. Their crew consisted of 162 officers and crewmen. Unlike her sister ship , Vasilissa Olga was not fitted out to accommodate an admiral and his staff.

The ships carried four  SK C/34  guns in single mounts with gun shields, designated 'A', 'B', 'X' and 'Y', from front to rear, one pair each superfiring forward and aft of the superstructure. Her anti-aircraft (AA) armament consisted of four  guns in four single mounts amidships and two quadruple mounts for Vickers  AA machineguns. The Vasilefs Georgios class carried eight above-water  torpedo tubes in two quadruple mounts. They had two depth charge launchers and a single rack for their 17 depth charges.

Wartime modifications
During her late 1941 refit in Calcutta, India, Vasilissa Olgas armament was revised to better suit her role as a convoy escort. The rear set of torpedo tubes was replaced by a  AA gun and 'Y' gun was removed to increase the number of depth charge throwers and depth charge stowage. To reduce topweight, the 3.7 cm guns were replaced by  Oerlikon autocannon. Her mainmast was removed and her aft funnel shortened to improve the arcs of fire of her AA guns. The ship was fitted with a Type 128 Asdic to improve her ability to detect submarines.

Construction and service
The Vasilefs Georgios-class ships were ordered on 29 January 1937 as part of a naval rearmament plan that was intended to include one light cruiser and at least four destroyers, one pair of which were to be built in Britain and the other pair in Greece. Vasilissa Olga was laid down at Yarrow & Company's shipyard in Scotstoun, Scotland, in February 1937, launched on 2 June 1938, and commissioned on 4 February 1939 without her armament, which was installed later in Greece.

After the  sank the elderly protected cruiser  in a sneak attack on 15 August 1940 off the island of Tinos, Vasilissa Olga and her sister were sent to Tinos to escort the merchant ships there home. During the Greco-Italian War she escorted convoys and participated in raids against Italian lines of communication in the Strait of Otranto on the nights of 14/15 November 1940 and 4/5 January 1941 that failed to locate any ships. The sisters ferried the Greek gold reserves to Crete on 1 March.

After the German invasion of Greece on 6 April, the sisters began to escort convoys between Greece and Egypt via Crete. On 22 April, Vasilissa Olga was ordered to evacuate elements of the Greek government to Crete, including Vice Admiral Alexandros Sakellariou who was the Minister for Naval Affairs, Chief of the Navy General Staff and Deputy Prime Minister. The following month she proceeded to Alexandria, Egypt, and then escorted convoys in the Eastern Mediterranean before departing for India to be modernized on 9 October.

The refit was completed on 5 January 1942 and the ship escorted convoys in the Arabian and Red Seas before arriving back in Alexandria on 22 February. Later that day, the submarine sank both Jaguar and Slavol. Vasilissa Olga ran aground in early May while escorting a convoy between Alexandria and Tobruk and damaged her propellers. After repairs the ship was transferred to the Indian Ocean where she escorted convoys there and in the Red Sea until December when she returned to the Mediterranean.

The submarine's crew was unable to scuttle their boat and it was taken in tow, although it later sank. The following month, the ship was assigned to escort the ocean liners transporting the Australian Army's 9th Division home from Egypt (Operation Pamphlet) as they passed through the Red Sea between 7 and 24 February.

The convoy, however, managed to limp away. The following month, the ship was assigned to escort the ships of the British Covering Force in the Ionian Sea during Operation Husky and later bombarded Catania, Sicily. After the Italian armistice on 8 September, Vasilissa Olga was one of the ships that escorted Italian ships to Malta on 10 September. The next day, she returned to Italian waters to escort the ships involved in Operation Avalanche.

The ship was transferred to the Eastern Mediterranean to support British forces involved in the Dodecanese Campaign in the Aegean Sea less than a week later, arriving at Alexandria on 16 September. Vasilissa Olga transported  of supplies and 300 men of the Queen's Own Royal West Kent Regiment from Haifa, Palestine, to reinforce the British garrison on Leros. After another supply run, she was sunk by Junkers Ju 88 bombers of LG 1 in Lakki on the morning of 26 September, with the loss of 72 men.

Notes

Bibliography

External links
 A complete operational record of Vasilissa Olga
 Historical summary from the Hellenic Navy website

Vasilefs Georgios-class destroyers
Ships built on the River Clyde
1938 ships
World War II destroyers of Greece
World War II shipwrecks in the Aegean Sea
Maritime incidents in September 1943
Dodecanese campaign
Destroyers sunk by aircraft
Ships sunk by German aircraft